Chesterton Road (part of the A1303) is a road in the north of Cambridge, England.

In October 2000, archaeologists excavating a sewerage shaft at the corner of Chesterton Lane and Magdalene Street discovered a collection of 13th- and 14th-century coins. Lying in the remains of a disintegrated wooden box,  on the site of what was once a house, the hoard totalled 1,805 silver pennies and nine gold coins.

References

roads in Cambridgeshire
streets in Cambridge
transport in Cambridge